The World Fantasy Awards are given each year by the World Fantasy Convention for the best fantasy fiction published in English during the previous calendar year. The awards have been described by book critics such as The Guardian as a "prestigious fantasy prize", and one of the three most prestigious speculative fiction awards, along with the Hugo and Nebula Awards (which cover both fantasy and science fiction). The World Fantasy Award—Collection is given each year for collections of fantasy stories by a single author published in English. A collection can have any number of editors, and works in the collection may have been previously published; awards are also given out for anthologies of works by multiple authors in the Anthology category. The Collection category has been awarded annually since 1975, though from 1977 through 1987 anthologies were admissible as nominees. Anthologies were split into a separate category beginning in 1988; during the 10 years they were admissible they won the award 7 times and were 38 of the 56 nominations.

World Fantasy Award nominees and winners are decided by attendees and judges at the annual World Fantasy Convention. A ballot is posted in June for attendees of the current and previous two conferences to determine two of the finalists, and a panel of five judges adds three or more nominees before voting on the overall winner. The panel of judges is typically made up of fantasy authors and is chosen each year by the World Fantasy Awards Administration, which has the power to break ties. The final results are presented at the World Fantasy Convention at the end of October. Winners were presented with a statue in the form of a bust of H. P. Lovecraft through the 2015 awards; more recent winners receive a statuette of a tree.

During the 48 nomination years, 167 writers have had works nominated; 46 of them have won, including ties and co-authors. Only six writers or editors have won more than once. Jeffrey Ford has won the regular collection award three times out of six nominations, while Karen Joy Fowler, Lucius Shepard, and Gene Wolfe won the regular collection award twice, out of two, four, and two nominations, respectively. Charles L. Grant and Kirby McCauley won the award as editors of anthologies while those were eligible; Grant was nominated nine times as an editor and once for a collection, while McCauley won both times he was nominated for anthologies. Grant's ten nominations are the most of any writer or editor, followed by Ramsey Campbell, Harlan Ellison, and Charles de Lint at five, with two of Campbell's nominations coming for anthologies. Dennis Etchison, Stephen King, Fritz Leiber, Kelly Link, and Stuart David Schiff have had the most nominations without winning at four; one of Etchison's and all of Schiff's nominations were for anthologies.

Winners and nominees
In the following table, the years correspond to the date of the ceremony, rather than when the collection was first published. Each year links to the corresponding "year in literature". Entries with a blue background and an asterisk (*) next to the author's name have won the award; those with a white background are the other nominees on the shortlist. If the work was an anthology rather than a collection, the editor's name is appended with (editor) to distinguish them from authors of collections.

  *   Winners

References

External links
 World Fantasy Convention official website

Awards established in 1975
Collection
Short story collection awards